Spelaeodiaptomus is a genus of copepods in the family Diaptomidae. It is monotypic, being represented by the single species, 
Spelaeodiaptomus rouchi. It is endemic to France.

References

Diaptomidae
Freshwater crustaceans of Europe
Monotypic arthropod genera
Endemic arthropods of Metropolitan France
Taxonomy articles created by Polbot